Erchin Serpedin is a professor from Texas A&M University in College Station, Texas. He was named a Fellow of the Institute of Electrical and Electronics Engineers (IEEE) in 2013 for his contributions to synchronization of communication systems.

References

Fellow Members of the IEEE
Living people
Year of birth missing (living people)
Place of birth missing (living people)
Texas A&M University faculty
American electrical engineers